Budsberg Pond is a lake in the U.S. state of Wisconsin.

Variant names are "Budsberg Lake" and "Horton Lake.". The lake was named after Peter Budsberg, an original owner of the site.

References

Lakes of Wisconsin
Bodies of water of Portage County, Wisconsin